Penicillium ubiquetum is a species of fungus in the genus Penicillium.

References 

ubiquetum
Fungi described in 2011